Indian Institutes of Handloom Technology (IIHTs) are government run public institutes of higher education in the handloom sector. There are six institutes in central sector and four in State sector.

Central sector IIHTs are under administrative control of Ministry of Textiles, Government of India and State sector IIHTs are under administrative control of respective state government and bodies.

The courses offered by the IIHTs are designed to cover various aspects of handloom technology, including designing, dyeing, weaving, printing, and finishing of handloom fabrics. The courses are offered at both the undergraduate and postgraduate levels

Institutes 

Note
 Central Sector IIHTs are funded by Government of India.
 State Sector IIHTs are funded by the respective State Government.

See also 
 Khadi
 Khādī Development and Village Industries Commission (Khadi Gramodyog)

References

External links 
http://www.iihtjodhpur.com
http://www.iihtchampa.in
https://iihtsrt.com
https://web.archive.org/web/20130906181403/http://cgiiht.in/aboutus.html

Technical universities and colleges in India
Weaving
Vocational education in India
Textile arts of India
Textile schools in India
Handloom industry in India